Vriesea menescalii is a plant species in the genus Vriesea. This species is endemic to Brazil.

References

menescalii
Flora of Brazil